Renzo Santiago Sheput Rodríguez (born 8 November 1980 in Lima, Peru) is a retired Peruvian footballer of Croatian descent, who played as an attacking midfielder.

Career 
Renzo Sheput started playing with Deportivo Zúñiga at the age of 7. He was promoted to the first team of the club which played in the Second Division. In 1998, he tried out for Sporting Cristal and was immediately signed. He started playing in the U-20 team for Sporting Cristal.

Due to his good performances with the U-20 team, head coach Juan Carlos Oblitas promoted him to the first team in the month of September, 1999. In 2001, he was loaned out to Union Minas for the first half of the year. He has also played for Universidad San Martín, Coronel Bolognesi FC, Alianza Atletico, Deportivo Municipal, La Equidad, and Juan Aurich.

On 22 November 2019, 39-year old Sheput announced his retirement from football.

Honours

Club 
Juan Aurich
 Torneo Descentralizado: 2011

Sporting Cristal
Torneo Descentralizado: 2002, 2012, 2014

References

External links

1980 births
Living people
Peruvian people of Croatian descent
Footballers from Lima
Association football wingers
Peruvian footballers
Peruvian expatriate footballers
Peru international footballers
Sporting Cristal footballers
Unión Minas footballers
Club Deportivo Universidad de San Martín de Porres players
Coronel Bolognesi footballers
Alianza Atlético footballers
Deportivo Municipal footballers
La Equidad footballers
Juan Aurich footballers
Sport Boys footballers
Carlos A. Mannucci players
Peruvian Segunda División players
Peruvian Primera División players
Categoría Primera A players
Peruvian expatriate sportspeople in Argentina
Peruvian expatriate sportspeople in Colombia
Expatriate footballers in Argentina
Expatriate footballers in Colombia